Judd Trump  (born 20 August 1989) is an English professional snooker player who is a former world champion and former world number one. Widely regarded as one of the sport's most talented players, he is currently sixth on the list of all-time ranking event winners, with 23 ranking titles. He has also won four Triple Crown titles.

After a junior career that included winning the English Under-13 and Under-15 titles, and reaching the World Under-21 Championship semi-finals aged 14, Trump turned professional in 2005. He won his maiden ranking title at the 2011 China Open, was runner-up to John Higgins at the 2011 World Snooker Championship, and captured his first Triple Crown title at the 2011 UK Championship. By the end of the 2017–18 season, he had won eight ranking titles, but was facing persistent criticism that he was underachieving in the sport, given his talent. In the 2018–19 season, he completed his Triple Crown by winning both the Masters and World Championship, won two other ranking events, and became the first player to win over £1 million in prize money in a single season. In the 2019–20 season, he won six ranking events, setting a new record for the most ranking titles in a single season. He added a further five ranking titles during the 2020–21 season. Voted the World Snooker Tour's Player of the Year for three consecutive years from 2019 to 2021, he was inducted into the Snooker Hall of Fame in 2021. He was World Championship runner-up for a second time in 2022 to Ronnie O'Sullivan, and was awarded an MBE in the same year. He won his second Masters title in 2023, making him the 11th player to win the tournament more than once.

Trump has compiled more than 900 century breaks in professional competition, making him the third player, after O'Sullivan and Higgins, to reach this milestone. In the 2019–20 season, he became the second player, after Neil Robertson, to achieve 100 century breaks in a single season. He has made eight maximum breaks in his career. In 2022, he became the second player, after Shaun Murphy, to compile three maximums in a single calendar year, having made 147s at the 2022 Turkish Masters, the 2022 Champion of Champions and the 2022 Scottish Open.

Career

Amateur career 
Trump was English Under-13 and Under-15 champion, and reached the World Under-21 Championship semi-finals at the age of 14.

Turning professional (2005–2010)
Trump joined the professional tour in the 2005–06 season, and at the Welsh Open he became the youngest player ever to qualify for the final stages of a ranking tournament. He also reached the last-48 stage at the China Open, losing 4–5 to Michael Holt, although this was designated the final qualifying round and was actually played in Prestatyn, Wales.

He defeated James Wattana 10–5 in the final round of qualifying at the 2007 World Championship, to become the third-youngest player ever at the time to reach the main stage of the tournament, after champions Stephen Hendry and Ronnie O'Sullivan, who had both been younger when they made their Crucible debuts. Trump is one of only five players to make their first appearance at Sheffield's Crucible Theatre at the age of 17, along with Hendry, O'Sullivan, China's Liu Chuang and Belgium's Luca Brecel. He played the 2005 champion and sixth seed Shaun Murphy in the first round, but lost 6–10 despite having led 6–5.

He did not build on this form in the 2007–08 season, only reaching the last 32 of the Welsh Open by beating Joe Swail 5–2 in the first round. He also missed out on the 2008 World Championship after a 9–10 loss to Swail in the final round of qualifying, despite having led 9–7.

Trump's fortunes changed for the 2008–09 season when he reached the venue stages of the first four events. At the Grand Prix, he benefited from Graeme Dott's withdrawal before defeating Joe Perry 5–2 in the last 16, despite Perry feeling that he had outplayed Trump, who himself admitted to not having played well. Then came the biggest win of his career so far, when he defeated Ronnie O'Sullivan 5–4 to reach the semi-final, in which he was defeated 4–6 by John Higgins. After that, Trump beat two-time world champion Mark Williams to qualify for the 2008 Bahrain Championship. He won a qualifying event in 2008 to gain entry into the 2009 Masters as the only qualifier, but was defeated by Mark Allen in the first round.  At the end of the snooker year, Trump failed again to reach the main stage of the World Championship, losing 8–10 to Stephen Lee in the final qualifying round, having led 6–3. Lee noted that Trump had not followed the custom of apologising for fluked shots during the match, and concluded "all I've heard about for the last five years in my area is how good he is, and he is good... but he's blown a 6–3 lead today and hopefully that will stick with him for a while yet." Trump ended the season in the top 32 of the rankings for the first time. He was coached for a short time by Tony Chappel.

Trump won the 2009 Championship League in the previous season to qualify for the Premier League event later in the year, in which he won four of his six matches including a 4–2 win over Ronnie O'Sullivan. He finished second in the League table but lost 1–5 to O'Sullivan in his semi-final.

The 2009–10 season was less successful for Trump as he failed to progress beyond the last 32 in any of the ranking tournaments. In January 2010, he joined Romford-based snooker agency Grove Leisure.

2010/2011
Trump defeated former world champions Peter Ebdon and Shaun Murphy at the 2011 China Open, to reach his first professional ranking event final. He then triumphed over last year's Masters champion Mark Selby 10–8 to win his first major title. He won £60,000 in prize money and provisionally climbed into the top 16 of the world rankings. On his way to winning the final, Trump made his 100th competitive century break.

Trump had already qualified for the 2011 World Championship when he won the China Open, and was drawn against reigning champion Neil Robertson in the first round, whom he defeated 10–8. In subsequent rounds, he knocked out Martin Gould 13–6, Graeme Dott 13–5 and Ding Junhui 17–15 to qualify for his first World Championship final. He lost 15–18 to John Higgins.

2011/2012
Trump started the season with a 3–5 loss to Mark Davis in the first round of the 2011 Australian Goldfields Open. This disappointment did not last long as he won the second PTC event of the season, beating Ding Junhui 4–0 in the final at a virtual home venue of the South West Snooker Academy. Trump then lost 1–5 to Stuart Bingham in the Shanghai Masters first round. Trump finished runner-up to Neil Robertson in the eighth PTC event of the season, but he immediately rediscovered his winning touch by capturing Event 9, overcoming Ronnie O'Sullivan 4–3 in the final in Antwerp, Belgium, in just over an hour's worth of play. He would later top the Order of Merit after all twelve PTC events had been played, thus qualifying for the 2012 Finals. He suffered a shock in the last 16 as world number 51 Xiao Guodong beat him 4–2, despite playing with a broken bone in his hand.

On 11 December 2011, Trump won his second ranking event tournament, the 2011 UK Championship at the Barbican Centre in York. He defeated Dominic Dale 6–4 in the last 32, then won the final two frames of the second round to edge out Ronnie O'Sullivan, 6–5. After the match, Trump said that he had been "outplayed" and was "lucky" to have got through. Next he dispatched Stephen Maguire 6–3, and faced Neil Robertson in the semi-finals. The semi-final match was a tight and nervy affair, with Trump stating afterwards that he believed Robertson was trying to stifle his natural game by "slowing it down" and "making things awkward", but nevertheless the Bristolian triumphed 9–7 to reach his first UK final. There he played Mark Allen, and trailed 1–3 early on in the best-of-19-frames match. Trump then produced a match-defining run of seven straight frames to take an 8–3 lead. Despite a strong fightback from Allen, who won five of the next six frames to trail just 8–9, Trump clinched the 18th frame with a break of 91, and won the final 10–8. The victory took him up to a career-high world ranking of 5. Six-time winner of the event, Steve Davis, said that Trump's performances during the championship had shown that he was "spearheading his generation" of snooker players.

Trump continued his fine form by reaching the semi-finals of the Masters in January. He defeated Stuart Bingham in the first round, and O'Sullivan once more in the quarter-finals 6–2, to make his record against the four-time World Champion five wins and two defeats, from their seven meetings in tournament play. Trump met Robertson in the semi-finals for the second successive major event, and it was the Australian who exacted his revenge for the defeat suffered in York a month earlier, as he triumphed 6–3. Trump reached three quarter-finals in his next four ranking events to become the world number 2 in April, behind Mark Selby, meaning that he had risen seven places in the rankings this season.

At the 2012 World Championship, Trump defeated Dominic Dale in their first round match by a 10–7 scoreline, despite suffering from food poisoning. He was knocked out in the second round by Ali Carter 12–13, letting a 12–9 lead slip, thus ending his chances of becoming world number 1 in the season.

2012/2013
Trump's first tournament this year was the Wuxi Classic in China, where he lost to Robert Milkins 3–5 in the second round, having beaten Dominic Dale 5–1 in the opener. At the Shanghai Masters he saw off Barry Hawkins, Mark Allen, Graeme Dott and Mark Williams to reach the final where he faced John Higgins. Trump surged into a 5–0 lead and, despite Higgins making a 147 break in the next frame, claimed a 7–2 advantage after the first session. Upon the resumption of play, Higgins won six frames in a row, with the match eventually going into a deciding frame, in which Trump made a break of 35 but ran out of position, allowing Higgins to secure the title with a 10–9 victory. Trump bounced back at the next ranking event, the inaugural International Championship, by claiming his third ranking event title. He eliminated Fergal O'Brien 6–3, Aditya Mehta 6–0 and then edged past Mark Allen 6–5 in the quarter-finals. Trump thrashed Peter Ebdon 9–1 in the semi-finals to become snooker's tenth world number one, and recovered from 6–8 down in the final against Neil Robertson to triumph 10–8.

Trump met John Higgins in back to back Players Tour Championship finals, losing the first 2–4, but gaining revenge in the second, the Bulgarian Open by whitewashing Higgins 4–0. Trump reached the final of the Premier League, having beaten Neil Robertson in the semi-finals, but he lost 2–7 to Stuart Bingham. In the defence of his 2011 UK Championship title, Trump played Mark Joyce in the first round. Despite leading 3–0 and 5–2, Trump lost the last four frames of the match to suffer a major shock exit against the world number 50. The disappointment was compounded when Mark Selby went on to win the title, reclaiming the top ranking in the process. Trump was defeated 1–6 by Graeme Dott at the Masters, and 4–5 by Anthony Hamilton in the first round of the German Masters. He regained his form and the world number one ranking at the Welsh Open. He came back from 1–3 down to beat Dominic Dale 4–3 in the first round, after which he asserted that "players are changing their game to play slower against me. Dominic was too slow for himself and it caught him out towards the end". More comfortable victories ensued over Andrew Higginson and Pankaj Advani to set up a semi-final meeting with Stephen Maguire. Trump initially raced into a 2–0 lead only to lose five frames in succession to the rejuvenated Maguire. Trump pulled back two more frames and looked set to force a decider after a 50 break in the tenth frame, but Maguire ground out the frame and won the match 6–4.

At the World Open, Trump gained revenge over Joyce by dispatching him 5–0, and he beat Nigel Bond 5–1, before Matthew Stevens won their quarter-final match 5–3. Trump qualified for the PTC Finals by finishing second on the Order of Merit, but lost to Alfie Burden 3–4 in the first round. He also lost in the first round of the China Open to good friend Jack Lisowski 3–5, surrendering his world number one ranking to Mark Selby again in the process.

Trump headed into the 2013 World Championship in less than auspicious form, though he himself said that he had prepared better than ever for the event. He beat Dominic Dale in the first round for the second year in a row, this time by 10–5. At 8–7 ahead in the last 16 against Marco Fu, Trump raced away with five consecutive frames to triumph 13–7 and set up a quarter-final clash with Shaun Murphy. Trump came from 3–8 down to level at 8–8 at the conclusion of the second session. The deciding frame lasted 53 minutes with Trump winning it on the yellow to seal a 13–12 victory. He met Ronnie O'Sullivan in the semi-finals, but was unable to capitalise on the chances that came his way: though he potted a ball in 24 of the 28 frames played, he could only make four breaks above 50 in an 11–17 defeat. Trump said afterwards "It's probably the worst I've played all tournament. I would've probably expected to lose to anyone the way I played."

2013/2014 

At the start of the season Trump was ranked third in the world rankings. He began the season poorly as he lost in the first rounds of the Wuxi Classic, the Shanghai Masters and the International Championship, as well as failing to qualify for the Indian Open. In November, he reached the final of the minor-ranking Kay Suzanne Memorial Cup but lost 1–4 to Mark Allen.
Later that month, he made the first official maximum break of his career in the Antwerp Open during a last-32 defeat against Mark Selby.
He reached the fourth round of the UK Championship, where Mark Allen defeated him 6–4, and he lost 5–6 to Marco Fu in the opening round of the Masters.

In the German Masters, he dropped just four frames in winning five matches to reach his first ranking final of the season, where he played Ding Junhui. Trump was two frames ahead twice in the first session, but it ended level at 4–4; he then lost five of the next six frames upon resumption of play to be defeated 5–9. At the Welsh Open, he was defeated 3–4 by John Higgins in the last 16. Higgins was again the victor when the two met in the last 16 of the World Open, winning 5–4 after Trump had taken a 4–0 lead. Trump won the non-ranking Championship League title during the season by beating Martin Gould 3–1.

Trump defeated Tom Ford and Ryan Day to reach the quarter-finals of the 2014 World Championship, where he played Neil Robertson. Trump led 6–2, 9–6 and 11–8, before Robertson launched a bold counterattack to take the last five frames and win the match 13–11. Trump received criticism for not acknowledging the fact that during the match, Robertson had become the first player to make 100 centuries in a single season, choosing to walk out of the arena instead. He later said that Robertson's achievement meant nothing to him and he chose to congratulate his opponent after the match.

2014/2015 
Trump was thrashed 0–5 by Stephen Maguire in the third round of the Wuxi Classic, but responded a week later by claiming his fourth ranking title, and his first for 20 months, at the Australian Goldfields Open, by defeating home favourite Neil Robertson 9–5 in the final. He reached the final of the Paul Hunter Classic but lost 2–4 to Mark Allen. He then suffered first and second round exits to Dominic Dale and Jamie Burnett respectively in the next two ranking events. He advanced to the final of the Champion of Champions but fell 3–8 down to Ronnie O'Sullivan, before reducing his deficit to a single frame by taking four successive frames with the help of two centuries. O'Sullivan won the two frames he needed to triumph 10–7, with Trump claiming his opponent's standard of play throughout the match was the best he had ever encountered. The pair also met in the final of the UK Championship in which Trump was 4–9 behind with a highest break of just 56. He won the 14th frame and then made back-to-back centuries and a break of 86 to only trail 8–9. He was 0–59 down in the next frame, but cleared the table with a 67 break to send the match into an unlikely decider; O'Sullivan then made a title-winning break after Trump had failed to escape from a snooker. O'Sullivan afterwards described the match as the hardest of his career. At the Masters, Trump lost 4–6 against Stephen Maguire in the first round. He made the second 147 of his career in the quarter-finals of the German Masters, but was knocked out 4–5 by Mark Selby.

At the inaugural World Grand Prix, Trump eliminated Mark Williams 4–3 on the final black, but then fell 1–5 behind against Martin Gould in the semi-finals. He then took five successive frames, outscoring Gould by 395 points to 37, to win the match 6–5. He played O'Sullivan for the third time in a final this season and was 4–7 behind, but then won six frames in a row, which included a 142 break (the highest of the tournament), to finish 10–7 and claim his second title of the season. He also reached the semi-finals of the PTC Grand Final, where he lost 2–4 to Williams.

At the 2015 World Championship, Trump produced his best snooker in the quarter-finals where he knocked in four centuries during a 13–4 thrashing of Ding Junhui. He stated afterwards that if he could play to the same standard in the rest of the event he would secure his first world title. After holding an early 2–1 lead over Stuart Bingham in the semi-finals, Trump could not hold onto his advantage and fell 16–14 behind. He then made successive centuries to force a deciding frame in which he missed a red to the middle pocket due to a kick, and Bingham took the match 17–16.

2015/2016 
In the defence of his Australian Goldfields Open title, Trump was knocked out in the quarter-finals 1–5 by Stephen Maguire. He reached the final of the Shanghai Masters, but a slow start from Trump saw him trail world number 54 Kyren Wilson 3–6 after the first session. Wilson also had leads of 8–4 and 9–7, before Trump sent the match into a deciding frame which Wilson won. Trump scored 278 points to nil in taking the first three frames of his third round UK Championship match with Liang Wenbo, but eventually lost 4–6. Trump branded the collapse an embarrassment and said it was the worst he had felt as a professional. In the new year, Trump and Neil Robertson set a record of six centuries in a best-of-11-frame match (four from Trump and two from Robertson). Trump closed it out with a sublime 129 break to win 6–5, with Robertson describing it as "the greatest Masters match ever". He was knocked out 4–6 in the semi-finals by Barry Hawkins.

His first title of the season came at the Championship League where he defeated Ronnie O'Sullivan 3–2 in the final. Soon afterwards he won his fifth ranking title and first for almost two years by beating Ricky Walden 10–4 in the China Open final. After trailing Liang Wenbo 3–7 in the first round of the 2016 World Championship, Trump tweeted that the drinks would be on him if he could turn it around. He duly did by winning 10–8 and put a few hundred pounds behind the local bar. Trump could not escape from a similar position against Ding Junhui in the second round and was beaten 10–13.

2016/2017 

Trump thrashed John Higgins 4–0 in the quarter-finals of the 2016 European Masters and then overcame Mark Selby 6–2 to play Ronnie O'Sullivan in the final. Trump was down 6–8, but took each of the remaining three frames to triumph 9–8 and win his sixth ranking title. In his next event, the English Open, he comfortably beat Higgins again in the quarter-finals, this time 5–1, and then defeated Barry Hawkins 6–2 to make it 14 wins in a row. He lost 6–9 to Liang Wenbo in the final after having missed a good chance to make it 7–7. Trump edged past Shaun Murphy 6–5 on the final black to reach the semi-finals of the International Championship where he was knocked out 4–9 by Ding Junhui. He had a surprise 2–6 defeat to Oliver Lines in the second round of the UK Championship. He was 5–1 up on Higgins in the semi-finals of the Scottish Open as he made three centuries and a 99 break, but Higgins recovered to win 6–5. In an extremely high quality first round match at the Masters, Trump made two centuries and Marco Fu three, followed by nine further breaks above 50 as Fu edged through 6–5.

Hawkins missed a match-ball yellow in their quarter-final clash at the Welsh Open, and Trump cleared the colours to win the match 5–4. He then defeated Scott Donaldson 6–3 to play Stuart Bingham in the final; he was 0–4 down, before recovering to lead 8–7, but lost the last two frames and the match. Another final followed at the Gibraltar Open as he come back from 0–2 down in the semi-finals against Ryan Day, but he lost the final 2–4 to Murphy. He reached his third ranking event final inside a month at the Players Championship where he reeled off a match-defining six frames in a row from 2–5 down to Fu, and went on to win his seventh ranking title 10–8. In the third round of the China Open, Trump made his first televised 147 as he defeated Tian Pengfei 5–3, but he suffered a surprise 3–5 loss to Hossein Vafaei in the quarter-finals.

Trump went into the 2017 World Championship declaring: "I honestly believe I can play to a standard which is very rare nowadays," and that he was "the best" in the world. He won the first four frames in his opening match, before Rory McLeod responded to lead 5–4. Trump appeared to be struggling with a shoulder injury and eventually lost the match 8–10 to a player ranked 52 places below him in the rankings.

2017/2018 

Trump was third in the world rankings at the start of the season. He successfully defended his European Masters title in October, defeating Stuart Bingham 9–7 in the final. The following month, he reached the quarter-finals of the International Championship where he was edged out 5–6 by Mark Allen. He then reached the final of the Shanghai Masters for the second time, but was heavily defeated 3–10 by Ronnie O'Sullivan.

He made semi-final appearances at three other ranking events this season: at the Scottish Open, he lost 4–6 to Cao Yupeng whom he had defeated two months earlier in the semi-finals of the European Masters; at the German Masters, he was beaten 1–6 by Mark Williams, after making the highest break of the tournament (140) in his quarter-final clash with Ding Junhui; and in defending his title at the Players Championship, he was narrowly defeated by Ronnie O'Sullivan 5–6. In January, he reached the semi-finals of the 2018 Masters where, despite leads of 3–1 and 5–2 earlier in the match, he was eliminated 5–6 by Kyren Wilson.

At the 2018 World Championship, Trump came close to suffering a first round defeat by Crucible debutant Chris Wakelin who took the match to a deciding frame. After beating Ricky Walden 13–9 in the second round, he was narrowly defeated in the quarter-finals by John Higgins in another final frame decider, the first time they had met in a World Championship match since the 2011 final.

2018/2019 
Trump began the 2018–19 season fifth in the world rankings. His defence of the European Masters ended with a surprise 2–4 defeat against Tian Pengfei in the second round. He won his first ranking title of the season at the Northern Ireland Open, beating Ronnie O'Sullivan 9–7 in the final. At the UK Championship, he suffered a 4–6 fourth round loss to Joe Perry. He then reached the semi-finals of the Scottish Open for the third time in a row, but was defeated 3–6 by Shaun Murphy. In January, Trump won his first Masters title, beating Kyren Wilson, Mark Selby and Neil Robertson en route to the final, where his opponent was Ronnie O'Sullivan. Trump dominated the match, taking a 7–1 lead, and eventually won it 10–4. A month later, he won his second ranking event of the season, the World Grand Prix, beating Ali Carter 10–6 in the final.

Two more semi-final appearances in March 2019, at the Players Championship and the Tour Championship, were followed by the biggest success of Trump's career so far, when he won the 2019 World Championship. He defeated Thepchaiya Un-Nooh 10–9 in the first round, having trailed 3–6 after the first session. In the second round against Ding Junhui, he led 5–1 and trailed 7–9, then won six consecutive frames to clinch a 13–9 victory. A comfortable 13–6 quarter-final win over Stephen Maguire took him to the semi-finals, where he beat Gary Wilson 17–11 to secure his second appearance in a world final.

His opponent was John Higgins, in a repeat of the 2011 final. Trailing 4–5 in the early stages, Trump dominated the second session, winning eight consecutive frames to lead 12–5 overnight, a display which Steve Davis described as the "controlled annihilation of a great player". Trump led 16–9 going into the final session, and won the opening two frames of the evening to seal an 18–9 win, and with it his first world title. The two players scored eleven centuries between them, a record for a professional match. Trump's seven centuries in the final equalled Ding Junhui's record for the most by one player in a World Championship match. Winning the world title also made Trump the 11th player to complete snooker's Triple Crown.

2019/2020 
Trump's first appearance as reigning world champion was at the International Championship in August 2019. He won the tournament by defeating Shaun Murphy 10–3 in the final, regaining the number one position in the snooker world rankings ahead of Ronnie O'Sullivan. He also won the World Open early in the season, defeating Thepchaiya Un-Nooh 10–5 in the final.

Trump reached the final of the Champion of Champions, where his opponent was Neil Robertson. Leading 9–8 in a best-of-19 frames match, Trump appeared to be on the verge of claiming the title as Robertson required snookers to win the 18th frame, which he got, winning 10–9.

In November, Trump won his third ranking tournament of the season, the Northern Ireland Open. In the final, he beat Ronnie O'Sullivan 9–7, the same scoreline with which he had won the title the previous year. He failed to earn a place in the European Masters the following month, losing 3–5 to Ian Burns in the first qualifying round. He defeated Neil Robertson 9–6 in the final of the German Masters, a match that featured a lot of "high-class safety", to claim his fourth ranking title of the season.

On 1 March 2020, Trump claimed a record-equalling fifth ranking title of the season when he defeated Yan Bingtao 10–4 in the final of the Players Championship. With this victory, he became the fifth player to win five ranking events in a single season, after Stephen Hendry, Ding Junhui, Mark Selby and Ronnie O'Sullivan.

Two weeks later, on 15 March, he became the first player ever to win six ranking titles in a single season, defeating Kyren Wilson 4–3 at the Gibraltar Open.

Trump qualified for the 2020 Tour championship as the leader of the one-season ranking list. He played John Higgins in the quarter-finals round. Trump took a 5–3 lead after the first session and finally prevailed 9–4 to progress to the semi-finals, where he played Stephen Maguire. The score was tied at 4–4 after the first session, but Trump struggled in the evening session and eventually lost 6–9.

Defending his world title at the 2020 World Snooker Championship, he fell prey to the "Crucible curse", losing 9–13 to Kyren Wilson in the quarter-finals. In his first-round match against Tom Ford, he made his 100th century break of the season, becoming only the second player, after Neil Robertson, to achieve that feat.

2020/2021 

In the first ranking tournament of the season, the European Masters, Trump lost 3–6 to Martin Gould in the semi-finals. At the English Open, he defeated Gary Wilson, Kyren Wilson and John Higgins to set up a final with Neil Robertson. The match went to a deciding frame, which Trump won with a century break. In the same month, he reached the Championship League final after topping all three group stages. He faced Kyren Wilson, who won the match 3–1, ending Trump's run of 10 consecutive ranking final victories.

In November, Trump won his third consecutive Northern Ireland Open, beating Ronnie O'Sullivan 9–7 in the final once again. In December, he reached the UK Championship final for the third time, but lost 9–10 to Neil Robertson, after missing a final pink in the hour-long deciding frame. At the final ranking event of 2020, the World Grand Prix, he defeated both Gould and O'Sullivan to reach the final, where he met Jack Lisowski. Trump led 6–2 after the first session. Even though Lisowski recovered to win four frames in a row, Trump won the title 10–7.

In January, Trump was forced to withdraw from the 2021 Masters after testing positive for COVID-19. He returned to competition at the German Masters, where he trailed Barry Hawkins 1–5 in the semi-final, but recovered to win five consecutive frames, making three consecutive centuries while doing so, to win the match 6–5. He went on to win the event with another victory over Jack Lisowski, by the scoreline of 9–2. He then successfully defended his Gibraltar Open title, defeating Lisowski once more in the final by 4–0, and winning 28 of the 31 frames he played in the tournament overall to claim his fifth ranking title of the season. He also secured the £150,000 European Series bonus, awarded to the player who wins the most prize money across the series, for a second consecutive season. Trump ended the snooker year with two more quarter-final appearances, at the Tour Championship, and, like last year, at the World Championship.

2021/2022 

At the British Open in August 2021, Trump lost 2–3 in the third round to Elliot Slessor. This loss meant that Mark Selby became world number one, with Trump dropping to second in the rankings.

Trump took advantage of a break in the snooker calendar to enter his first nine-ball pool tournament, the 2021 U.S. Open Pool Championship, staged in Atlantic City. Although he easily won his three opening matches, he lost 1–11 to Jayson Shaw to move to the losers' side of the bracket, and then lost 10–11 to Jason Theron to exit the tournament. Trump stated his intention to continue competing in nine-ball pool, saying that "I had a lot more support from fans than I was expecting, and there were enough positives to make me do it again."

In November, Trump defeated Higgins 10–4 in the 2021 Champion of Champions final, winning the invitational tournament for the first time. He also reached the semi-finals of the invitational 2022 Masters, but lost in a deciding frame to Barry Hawkins. After this, his performance in ranking events was less impressive than in the previous two seasons, which had seen him win a combined 11 ranking titles. He reached the quarter-finals of the 2021 Northern Ireland Open, the 2021 English Open and the 2022 German Masters, but did not feature in any ranking semi-finals or finals until the 12th ranking event of the season, the 2022 Welsh Open, where he reached his first ranking final since the 2021 Gibraltar Open a year earlier. He lost 5–9 to Joe Perry though. The following week, he won his first ranking title of the season and the 23rd of his career at the 2022 Turkish Masters in Antalya, defeating Matthew Selt 10–4 in the final. In the 10th frame of the match, he made his sixth maximum break. Reaching the final of the Welsh Open and winning the Turkish Masters meant that Trump moved from 17th to fourth place on the season's money list, guaranteeing his place in the 2022 Tour Championship, though, like in the previous edition of the tournament, he exited after his first match, as Luca Brecel defeated him 10–6.

Trump reached his third world final at the 2022 World Snooker Championship, but lost 13–18 to Ronnie O'Sullivan. He finished the season regaining his number two spot in the world rankings, having dropped to fourth place beforehand.

Trump was appointed Member of the Order of the British Empire (MBE) in the 2022 Birthday Honours for services to snooker and charity.

2022/2023 

Trump had a somewhat disappointing season start, suffering many early round exits. He did play in the quarter-finals of the 2022 Hong Kong Masters and the 2022 European Masters though, and was a finalist in the 2022 Champion of Champions, although he did not manage to defend his title, losing to Ronnie O'Sullivan 10–6. During the final of the tournament, Trump made his seventh maximum break, then within less than a month he completed his eighth in the second round of the 2022 Scottish Open, against Mitchell Mann. He exited the event at the quarter-final stage, however, losing 4–5 to Thepchaiya Un-Nooh on a respotted black in the decider. His result was the same at the next Home Nations event, the English Open, being defeated 1–5 by Luca Brecel.

The second half of the season started off much better for Trump, as he won his second Masters title in the 2023 edition of the event, defeating Mark Williams 10–8. At the next event, the 2023 World Grand Prix, he lost 9–10 to Mark Allen in the final, despite forcing a decider after being 2–7 down. He was a finalist of the 2023 Championship League too, there he was beaten 1–3 by defending champion John Higgins. In the next tournament, the 2023 Six-red World Championship, he made it to the quarter-finals before losing 5–6 in another decider against Hossein Vafaei.

Performance and rankings timeline

Career finals

Ranking finals: 37 (23 titles)

Minor-ranking finals: 8 (4 titles)

Non-ranking finals: 14 (8 titles)

Team finals: 1

Pro-am finals: 8 (5 titles)

Amateur finals: 1 (1 title)

Maximum and century breaks

Trump has completed eight maximum breaks, recording his first at the 2013 Antwerp Open against Mark Selby. He has compiled more than 900 century breaks in professional competition. He made his 900th century on 17 March 2023, in his first round match at the WST Classic against David Lilley.

See also

References

External links

 Judd Trump at worldsnooker.com
 Global Snooker profile

English snooker players
Sportspeople from Bristol
1989 births
Living people
World number one snooker players
UK champions (snooker)
Masters (snooker) champions
Winners of the professional snooker world championship